Wild Life was a Melbourne-based, Australian, illustrated,  monthly natural history magazine that was published from 1938 to 1954.  It was established by newspaper proprietor Sir Keith Murdoch and largely edited by Philip Crosbie Morrison throughout its existence.

References

1938 establishments in Australia
1954 disestablishments in Australia
Monthly magazines published in Australia
Defunct magazines published in Australia
Magazines established in 1938
Magazines disestablished in 1954
Magazines published in Melbourne
Wildlife magazines